Falcones may refer to:

People
 Baldomero Falcones (born 1946) Spanish businessman
 Ildefonso Falcones (born 1959) Spanish lawyer and author
 Soleil (singer) (born 1983; as Soleil Falcones) Argentinian singer

Other uses
 Arturo Falcones, a fictional Marvel Comics character
 The Falcones (band), a predecessor band to Los Lonely Boys
 Cayo Falcones (Falcons Key), Sabana-Camagüey Archipelago, Cuba

See also

 Pompeii Falcones, an Ancient Roman family
 Sosii Falcones, an Ancient Roman family
 
 Falconi (surname)
 Falcon (disambiguation)
 Falcone (disambiguation)